Franklin Edvard Denholm (November 29, 1923 – April 7, 2016) was a member of the United States House of Representatives from South Dakota.  He was born in Scotland Township of Day County, South Dakota.

Early life and education
He was educated in the public schools of the area, and graduated from South Dakota State University in 1956.  He went on to receive a degree in J.D. from the University of South Dakota School of Law, and continued to do post-graduate work in the field of public administration at the University of Minnesota.

Career
He worked as a farmer and auctioneer, and engaged in the business of interstate trucking.  He was elected to the position of Day County Sheriff in 1950, and served in that capacity through 1952, and later joined the Federal Bureau of Investigation in 1956, serving there through 1961. 
 
He was admitted to the bar in 1962 under diploma privilege. He returned to Brookings, South Dakota to start his legal practice.  During this time back in Brookings, he also served as a lecturer in economics, law, and political science at South Dakota State University.

Political career
He was a delegate to the South Dakota State Democratic conventions in 1950 and 1952, and later to the Democratic National Convention in 1968.

He was elected as a Democrat to the United States House of Representatives in 1971, and remained in that role until 1975, after losing the election in 1974 in a major upset.  He then returned to the practice of law in Brookings, South Dakota, the city in which he lived after office.

Death
Denholm died on April 7, 2016, at the age of 92 in Brookings, South Dakota.

References

External links

1923 births
2016 deaths
People from Day County, South Dakota
Democratic Party members of the United States House of Representatives from South Dakota
South Dakota sheriffs
Federal Bureau of Investigation agents
South Dakota lawyers
Farmers from South Dakota
People from Brookings, South Dakota
20th-century American politicians
20th-century American lawyers
South Dakota State University alumni
University of South Dakota alumni
University of South Dakota School of Law alumni
Humphrey School of Public Affairs alumni
South Dakota State University faculty